Amiran Amirkhanov (born 27 February 1986) is an Armenian professional basketball player, currently playing for BC Urartu.

He represented Armenia's national basketball team at the 2016 FIBA European Championship for Small Countries in Ciorescu, Moldova, where he was his team's best passer and the third-best passer of the tournament.

References

External links
 FIBA profile
 EuroLeague profile
 Eurobasket.com profile

1986 births
Living people
Point guards
Armenian men's basketball players
Armenian people of Russian descent